Vinnie Moore (born 21 August 1964) is an English former association football player and manager.

References

External links 
 

1964 births
Living people
Sportspeople from Scunthorpe
English footballers
Clydebank F.C. (1965) players
Airdrieonians F.C. (1878) players
Stirling Albion F.C. players
Ayr United F.C. players
Albion Rovers F.C. players
Scottish Football League players
English football managers
Albion Rovers F.C. managers
Scottish Football League managers
Association football midfielders